Suvimol Duangchan (born 10 April 1974) is a Thai former professional tennis player.

Born in Chiang Mai, Duangchan played on tour in the 1990s and featured in a total of 27 Fed Cup ties for Thailand. She had a 21/19 overall win–loss record, which included a singles win over Romania's Irina Spîrlea.

Duangchan won a gold medal for Thailand at the 1991 Southeast Asian Games in Manila and represented her country in the doubles at the 1992 Barcelona Olympics, partnering Benjamas Sangaram.

ITF finals

Singles (5–4)

Doubles (5–3)

References

External links
 
 
 

1974 births
Living people
Suvimol Duangchan
Suvimol Duangchan
Tennis players at the 1992 Summer Olympics
Southeast Asian Games medalists in tennis
Suvimol Duangchan
Suvimol Duangchan
Suvimol Duangchan
Tennis players at the 1994 Asian Games
Tennis players at the 1998 Asian Games
Suvimol Duangchan
Competitors at the 1991 Southeast Asian Games
Suvimol Duangchan
Suvimol Duangchan